Justin Ernest (born December 17, 1972) is a former American football defensive tackle. He played his college football at Eastern Kentucky University, where he was a 1997 All-Ohio Valley Conference pick. He never went on to play an NFL game despite his record-breaking combine.

Ernest established the current 225-pound bench press record at the NFL Scouting Combine with 51 repetitions.

References

1972 births
Living people
American football defensive tackles
Eastern Kentucky Colonels football players
New Orleans Saints players